Sadie Katz (born October 13, 1978 as Sadie Lorraine Jones) is an American actress, WGA writer, director, and producer from Los Angeles, California.

Career 
Sadie Katz is best known for playing Sally Hillicker in Wrong Turn 6: Last Resort.  Due to her acting credits and the types of films she has starred in (which include Party Bus to Hell, Blood Feast, House of Bad, Dread Central, and Shock Till You Drop), she is considered to be a scream queen.

She wrote the script for Scorned, which was loosely inspired by a breakup in her own life. She is also known for the documentary The Bill Murray Experience, of which she wrote, directed, produced, and starred in. Katz is a festival and an indie actress who has co-starred alongside June Squibb, Tara Reid, Billy Zane, and Danny Trejo.

Filmography

References

External links 
 
 

Living people
21st-century American actresses
1978 births
Actresses from Orange County, California
American film actresses
American voice actresses